The Women's 200 metres at the 2014 Commonwealth Games, as part of the athletics programme, was held at Hampden Park on 30 and 31 July 2014.

Results

Heats

Heat 1

Heat 2

Heat 3

Heat 4

Heat 5

Heat 6

Semi-finals

Semi-final 1

Semi-final 2

Semi-final 3

Final

Wind: +0.4 m/s

References

Women's 200 metres
2014
2014 in women's athletics